Mikhail Vladimirovich Muromov (born 18 November 1950, Moscow ) is a Soviet Russian singer, actor, musician and composer.

Discography 
1984 – Captains
1986 – Risk Area
1986 – Home Magnetoalbum
1987 – Apples in Snow
1987 – The Guys from Afghanistan
1987 – Sings Mikhail Muromov
1988 – Business Woman
1989 – The Witch
1990 – Sweet Poison
1990 – №1 (LP)
1992 – Super 2 (LP)
1994 – Afghanistan
1994 –  A Strange Woman
1994 – Salute, Beloved
2001 – Names For All Times
2005 – Grand Collection 
2017  – Pink on White 2017

Popular songs
 Apples in Snow (Andrey Dementyev)
 Ariadna (Rimma Kazakova)
 Afghanistan (Andrey Dementyev)
 Forest Academy (Sergey Mikhalkov)
 A Strange Woman (Larisa Rubalskaya)

Filmography 
1981 —  The Only Man as policeman 
1982 —  The Trust That Went Bust as busker
1982 —  Just Awful! as composer 
1986 – The Right People as bouncer at the restaurant 
1987 —  Daughter as Alexander, the singer 
1991 —  Dura as Miguel

References

External links 
 
  Profile Mikhail Muromov on Moskva.FM
   

1950 births
Living people
Soviet male singers
Soviet composers
Soviet male composers
Russian composers
Russian male composers
Soviet male actors
20th-century Russian male actors
Russian male film actors
20th-century Russian male singers
20th-century Russian singers